This is a list of the officers who have held the army rank of field marshal or marshal. It does not include air force marshals.

Afghanistan

 HM Nasrullah Khan (1875–1920)
 2004 - Mohammed Fahim (1957–2014)
 2020 - Abdul Rashid Dostum (b. 1954)

Albania

 1 September 1928 - HM King Zog (1895–1961)

Australia
 20 March 1925 - William Riddell Birdwood, 1st Baron Birdwood (1865–1951; honorary)
 2 June 1938 - HM King George VI (1895–1952; honorary)
 8 June 1950 - Sir Thomas Blamey (1884–1951)
 1 April 1954 - HRH Prince Philip, 1st Duke of Edinburgh (1921–2021; honorary)

Austria/Austria-Hungary
 List of Austrian field marshals
 List of Marshals of Austria

Bahrain
 HM King Hamad bin Isa Al Khalifa (b. 1950)
 HRH Crown Prince Salman bin Hamad bin Isa Al Khalifa (b. 1969)
 Shaikh Khalifa bin Ahmed Al Khalifa

Belarus
 Alexander Lukashenko (b. 1954)

Brandenburg
 List of Brandenburger field marshals

Brazil
 List of Brazilian marshals

Chad
 11 August 2020 - Idriss Déby (1952–2021)

Cambodia

 1971 - Lon Nol (1913–1985)
 HRH Prince Norodom Ranariddh (1944–2021)
 2009 - Heng Samrin (b. 1934)
 2009 - Chea Sim (b. 1932)
 2009 - Hun Sen (b. 1952)

Central African Empire
 Jean-Bédel Bokassa (1921–1986)

Republic of China

 1912 - Yuan Shikai (1859–1916)
 1917 - Sun Yat-sen (1866–1925)
 1921 - Tang Jiyao (1883–1927)
 1921 - Lu Rongting (1856–1927)
 1927 - Zhang Zuolin (1875–1928)
 1935 - Chiang Kai-shek (1887–1975)

People's Republic of China

 1955 - Zhu De (1886–1976)
 1955 - Peng Dehuai (1898–1974)
 1955 - Lin Biao (1908–1971?)
 1955 - Liu Bocheng (1892–1986)
 1955 - He Long (1896–1969)
 1955 - Chen Yi (1901–1972)
 1955 - Luo Ronghuan (1902–1963)
 1955 - Xu Xiangqian (1901–1990)
 1955 - Nie Rongzhen (1899–1992)
 1955 - Ye Jianying (1897–1986)

Republic of Croatia
 1995 - Franjo Tuđman  (1922–1999)

Croatia
 1941 - Slavko Kvaternik (1876–1947)

Kingdom of Egypt

 HH Abbas I Hilmi Pasha (1813–1854)
 HH Ibrahim Pasha (1789–1848)
 Yahya Mansur Yeghen (1837–1913)
 Horatio Herbert Kitchener (1850–1916)
 20 December 1914 - HH Sultan Hussein Kamel (1853–1917)
 HM King Fuad I (1868–1936)
 'Aziz 'Ali al-Misri (1879–1965)
 HM King Farouk (1920–1965)
 1949 - HM King Abdullah I of Jordan (1882–1951)
 26 July 1952 - HM King Fuad II (b. 1952)
 21 February 1955 - HM King Hussein of Jordan (1935–1999)

Republic of Egypt
 Abdel Hakim Amer (1919–1967)
 November 1973 - Ahmad Ismail Ali (1917–1974)
 Abdel Ghani el-Gamasy (1921–2003)
 Ahmed Badawi (1927–1981)
 Mohammed Aly Fahmy (1920–1999)
 Abd al-Halim Abu Ghazala (1930–2008)
 1993 - Mohamed Hussein Tantawi (b. 1935)
 2014 - Abdel Fattah el-Sisi (b. 1954)

Ethiopia

 HIM Emperor Haile Selassie (1892–1975)
 8 January 2022 - Birhanu Jula

Finland

 1933 - Carl Gustaf Emil Mannerheim (1867–1951)

France
 List of Marshals of France

Germany

 List of German field marshals

Ghana
 1965 - Kwame Nkrumah (1909–1972)

Greece
 1913 - HM King Constantine I (1868–1923)
 1937 - HM King George II (1890–1947)
 1947 - HM King Paul (1901–1964)
 28 October 1949 - Alexandros Papagos (1883–1955)
 1964 - HM King Constantine II (b. 1940)

Guelders
 1528 - Maarten van Rossum (1490–1555)

Holy Roman Empire
 List of field marshals of the Holy Roman Empire

India

 1 January 1973 - Sam Manekshaw (1914–2008)
 28 April 1986 - K. M. Cariappa (1899–1993)

Iran
 List of Iranian field marshals

Iraq
 HM King Faisal I (1883–1933)
 8 September 1933 - HM King Ghazi (1912–1939)
 6 April 1939 - HRH Prince 'Abd al-Ilah (1913–1958)]
 2 May 1953 - HM King Faisal II (1935–1958)
 Abdul Salam Arif (1921–1966)
 Ahmed Hassan al-Bakr (1914–1982)
 1979 - Saddam Hussein (1937–2006)
 Izzat Ibrahim al-Douri (1942–2020)

Italy
 4 November 1924 - Conte Luigi Cadorna (1850–1928)
 4 November 1924 - Armando Diaz (1861–1928)
 25 June 1926 - Emanuele Filiberto, 2nd Duke of Aosta (1869–1931)
 25 June 1926 - Pietro Badoglio (1871–1956)
 25 June 1926 - Enrico Caviglia (1862–1945)
 25 June 1926 - Gaetano Giardino ( 1864–1935)
 25 June 1926 - Guglielmo Pecori-Giraldi (1856–1941)
 16 November 1935 - Emilio De Bono (1866–1944)
 9 May 1936 - Rodolfo Graziani (1882–1955)
 30 March 1938 - HM King Vittorio Emanuele III (1869–1948)
 30 March 1938 - Benito Mussolini (1883–1945)
 1 July 1942 - Conte Ugo Cavallero (1880–1943)
 12 August 1942 - Ettore Bastico (1876–1972)
 29 October 1942 - HM King Umberto II (1904–1983)
 12 May 1943 - Giovanni Messe (1883–1968)

Japan
 List of Japanese field marshals

Jordan
 1948 - HM King Abdullah I (1882–1951)
 20 July 1951 - HM King Talal (1909–1972)
 11 August 1952 - HM King Hussein (1935–1999)
 Habis al-Majali (1914–2001)
 Fat'hi Abu Taleb
 Abdul Hafeth Al Ka'abnah
 7 February 1999 - HM King Abdullah II (b. 1962)
 2005 - Sa'ad Khair (d.2009)

Liberia
 Samuel Doe (1951–1990)

Libya
 14 September 2016 - Khalifa Haftar (b. 1943)

Malaysia

 31 August 1957 - Tuanku Abdul Rahman of Negeri Sembilan (1885–1960)
 14 April 1960 - Sultan Hisamuddin Alam Shah of Selangor (1898–1960)
 21 September 1960 - Tuanku Syed Putra of Perlis (1920–2000)
 21 September 1965 - Sultan Ismail Nasiruddin Shah of Terengganu (1907–1979)
 21 September 1970 - Tuanku Abdul Halim of Kedah (b. 1927)
 21 September 1975 - Sultan Yahya Petra of Kelantan (1917–1979)
 29 March 1979 - Sultan Ahmad Shah of Pahang (b. 1930)
 26 April 1984 - Sultan Iskandar of Johor (1932–2010)
 26 April 1989 - Sultan Azlan Shah of Perak (1928-2014)
 26 April 1994 - Tuanku Jaafar of Negeri Sembilan (1922–2008)
 26 April 1999 - Sultan Salahuddin Abdul Aziz Shah of Selangor (1926–2001)
 13 December 2001 - Tuanku Syed Sirajuddin of Perlis (b. 1943)
 13 December 2006 - Mizan Zainal Abidin of Terengganu (b. 1962)
 13 December 2011 - Tuanku Abdul Halim of Kedah (1927–2017)
 13 December 2016 - Muhammad V of Kelantan (b. 1969)
 31 January 2019 - Abdullah of Pahang (b. 1959)

Mongolia
 Khorloogiin Choibalsan (1895–1952)
 Gelegdorjiin Demid (1900–1937)
 Yumjaagiin Tsedenbal (1916–1991)

Morocco
 17 November 1970 - Mohammed ben Mizzian (1897–1975)

Mozambique
 Samora Machel (1933–1986)

Nepal
 HH Maharaja Chandra Shamsher of Lambjang and Kaski (1863–1929)
 HH Maharaja Bhim Shamsher of Lambjang and Kaski (1865–1962)
 HH Maharaja Juddha Shamsher of Lambjang and Kaski (1875–1952)
 HH Maharaja Padma Shamsher of Lambjang and Kaski (1882–1961)
 HH Maharaja Mohan Shamsher of Lambjang and Kaski (1885–1967)
 HH Sir Keshar Shamsher Jung Bahadur Rana (1892–1964)
 Hari Shamsher Jang Bahadur Rana
 Sir Nir Shamsher Jang Bahadur Rana (1913–2013)
 Sir Kiran Shamsher Jang Bahadur Rana (1916–1983)
 14 April 1953 - HM King Tribhuvan (1906–1955)
 1954 - Rudra Shamsher Jang Bahadur Rana (1879–1964)
 2 May 1956 - HM King Mahendra (1920–1972)
 1972 - HM King Birendra (1945–2001)
 2 June 2001 - HM King Gyanendra (b. 1947)

New Zealand

 11 June 1977 - HRH Prince Philip, 1st Duke of Edinburgh (1921–2021)
 3 August 2015 - HM King Charles III (b. 1948)

North Korea
 1953 - Kim Il-sung (1912–1994)
 1992 - O Chin-u (1917–1995)
 1992 - Kim Jong-Il (1942–2011)
 1995 - Ri Ul-sol (1921–2015)
 1995 - Choi Kwang (1919–1997)
 July 2012 - Kim Jong-un (b. 1983)
 April 2016 - Kim Yong-chun (1936–2018)
 April 2016 - Hyon Chol-hae (b. 1934)
 October 2020 - Ri Pyong-chol (b. 1948)
 October 2020 - Pak Jong-chon

Ottoman Empire
 List of field marshals of the Ottoman Empire

Pakistan
 1958 - Ayub Khan (1907–1974)

Peru
 List of Marshals of Peru

Philippines
  24 August 1936 - Douglas MacArthur (1880–1964)

Poland
 List of Polish field marshals

Portugal
 List of Marshals of Portugal

Prussia
 List of Prussian field marshals

Romania
 1914 - HM King Ferdinand (1865–1927)
 1927 (1940) - HM King Michael I (1921–2017)
 1930 - HM King Carol II (1893–1953)
 1930 - Alexandru Averescu (1859–1938)
 1930 - Constantin Prezan (1861–1943)
 21 August 1941 - Ion Antonescu (1886–1946)

Russian Empire
 List of Russian field marshals

Russian Federation
 Igor Sergeyev (1938–2006)

Saudi Arabia
 1991 - HH Prince Khalid bin Sultan (b. 1949)
 Saleh Al-Muhaya (b. 1939)

Saxony
 List of Saxon field marshals

Serbia

 14 January 1900 - HM King Milan I (1854–1901)
 27 January 1901 - HM King Alexander I (1876–1903)
 15 Jun 1903 - HM King Peter I (1844–1921)
 20 October 1912 - Radomir Putnik (1847–1917)
 20 August 1914 - Stepa Stepanović (1856–1929)
 4 December 1914 - Živojin Mišić (1855–1921)
 13 September 1918 - Petar Bojović (1858–1945)

South Africa
 24 May 1941 - Jan Smuts (1870–1950)

Soviet Union
 List of Marshals of the Soviet Union

Spain

 1792 - Antonio Olaguer Feliú (1742–1813)
 1810 - Henry Joseph O'Donnell, Count of La Bisbal (1769–1834)
 1818 - Manuel Olaguer Feliú (1759–1824)
 1844 - Ramón María Narváez y Campos, Duke of Valencia (1800–1868)
 1869 - Juan Prim, Marquis of Los Castillejos (1814–1870)

Sri Lanka

 22 March 2015 - Sarath Fonseka (b. 1950)

Sudan
 Gaafar Nimeiry (1930–2009)
 Abdel Rahman Swar al-Dahab (b. 1934)
 Omar al-Bashir (b. 1944)

Sweden
 List of Swedish field marshals

Syria
 Husni al-Za'im (1897–1949)
 Bashar al-Assad (b. 1965)

Thailand
 List of field marshals of Thailand

Tunisia
 14 August 1840 - HH Abu Abbas Ahmed I Pasha Bey (1806–1855)
 7 August 1855 - HH Muhammed Pasha Bey (1811–1859)
 10 December 1859 - HH Muhammed as-Sadiq Pasha Bey (1813–1882)
 28 October 1882 - HH Ali III Pasha Bey (1817–1902)
 11 June 1902 - HH Muhammad al-Hadi Pasha Bey (1855–1906)
 11 May 1906 - HH Muhammed al-Nasir Pasha Bey (1855–1922)
 10 July 1922 - HH Muhammad al-Habib Pasha Bey (1858–1929)
 11 February 1929 - HH Ahmed II Pasha Bey (1862–1942)
 19 June 1942 - HH Muhammad al-Munsif Pasha Bey (1881–1948)
 15 May 1943 - HH Muhammed al-Amin Pasha Bey (1881–1962)

Turkey
21 September 1921 - Mustafa Kemal Atatürk (1881–1938)
31 August 1922 - Fevzi Çakmak (1876–1950)

Uganda
 1975 - Idi Amin (1928–2003)

United Kingdom
 List of British field marshals

Venezuela
 1824 - Antonio José de Sucre   (1795–1830)

Yemen
 24 December 1997 - Ali Abdullah Saleh (b. 1942)

Yemen Arab Republic
 Abdullah as-Sallal (1917–1994)

Yugoslavia

 16 August 1921 - HM King Alexander I (1888–1934)
 9 October 1934 - HM King Peter II (1923–1970)
 29 November 1943 - Josip Broz Tito (1892–1980)

Zaire
 1983 - Mobutu Sese Seko  (1930–1997)

Other countries

The rank also exists or has existed (on paper at least) in Bangladesh, Brunei, South Korea, Nigeria, Oman, and South Vietnam, but not all of these countries have used it.

Footnotes